Neolamprologus obscurus is a species of cichlid endemic to Lake Tanganyika where it is only known from southern end of the lake where it inhabits crevices.  This species reaches a length of  TL.  It can also be found in the aquarium trade.

References

obscurus
Fauna of Zambia
Taxa named by Max Poll
Fish described in 1978
Taxonomy articles created by Polbot